Epeorus namatus is a species of flatheaded mayfly in the family Heptageniidae. It is found in North America.

References

Mayflies
Articles created by Qbugbot
Insects described in 1946